Jalan Bukit Fraser 2, or Jalan Baru Bukit Fraser and Jalan Pechah Batu, Federal Route 148, is a second federal road in Fraser's Hill, Pahang, Malaysia, designed as a downhill route to Federal Route 55. It is maintained by the Malaysian Public Works Department (JKR) and the Fraser's Hill Development Corporation (FHDC). The Kilometre Zero of the Federal Route 148 starts at the peak of Fraser's Hill.

Features

At most sections, the Federal Route 148 was built under the JKR R5 road standard, allowing maximum speed limit of up to 90 km/h.

List of junctions

The entire route is located within the district of Raub, Pahang. All junctions listed are at-grade intersections unless stated otherwise.

References

Malaysian Federal Roads